Senator Izard may refer to:

Mark W. Izard (1799–1866), Arkansas State Senate
Ralph Izard (1740s–1804), U.S. Senator from South Carolina